Kerry Reid defeated Dianne Fromholtz in the final, 7–5 6–2 to win the January Edition women's singles tennis title at the 1977 Australian Open. The first of the two Australian Opens held in 1977 started on 3 January and ended on 9 January. For the second Australian Open held in December 1977, see: 1977 Australian Open (December).

Evonne Goolagong was the three-time reigning champion, but did not compete in January 1977.

Seeds
The seeded players are listed below. Kerry Reid is the champion; others show the round in which they were eliminated.

  Dianne Fromholtz (final)
  Kerry Reid (champion)
  Helen Gourlay (semifinals)
  Betsy Nagelsen (first round)

Qualifying

Draw

Finals

Top half

Bottom half

See also
1977 Australian Open (January)

External links
 1977 Australian Open (January) – Women's draws and results at the International Tennis Federation

Women's Singles, 1977
1977
1977 in Australian women's sport
1977 WTA Tour